Syed Muhammad Fazlul Karim (1935 – 25 November 2006) was an Islamic scholar and politician. He was the founder of Islami Andolan Bangladesh, and founded a residential madrassah in Charmonai, Barisal, southern Bangladesh.

Early life and education
Syed Muhammad Fazlul Karim was born in 1935, in the village of Charmonai in Barisal, Bengal Province. He belonged to a Bengali Muslim family who were the hereditary Pirs of Charmonai, with his grandfather, Sayed Amjad Ali, being a descendant of Ali, the fourth Caliph of Islam. His father, Syed Muhammad Ishaq, was the first Pir of Charmonai. Karim began studying with his father at an early age, later joining his father's madrasa in Charmonai. After completing his degree in Islamic Studies from Alia Madrasah, he joined Jamia Qurania Arabia Lalbagh, Dhaka. He completed Dawra e Hadith from this institution in 1957.

Career
Karim started his career as a teacher at Charmonai Madrasah. In 1987, he established Islami Shashontantra Andolan. He served as the head of the movement until his death in 2006.

Death
After long suffering from diabetes and kidney disease Fazlul Karim died at the age 71 in his own home at village Charmonai in Sadar upazila of Barisal district on 25 November 2006. He had two wives, seven sons and a daughter.

References

External links
 Pir Saheb Charmonai
 Islami Andolan Bangladesh
 Islami Shasontontro Chhattra Andolan

1935 births
2006 deaths
People from Barisal District
Bangladeshi Sunni Muslim scholars of Islam
Bangladeshi Islamic religious leaders
Deobandis
20th-century Muslim scholars of Islam
Chormonai movement
20th-century Bengalis
Bangladeshi political party founders
Bangladeshi people of Arab descent
Bengali Muslim scholars of Islam